WTMP (1150 kHz) is an AM radio station serving the Tampa Bay, Florida region. The station is licensed to Egypt Lake, Florida and owned by Neal Ardman of NIA Broadcasting, Inc.
It also broadcasts on FM translator W271DL on 102.1 MHz in Egypt Lake and just added on October 1, 2022, W225CQ 92.9 MHz in Tampa. WTMP's studios are located on Howard Avenue in West Tampa, and its transmitter is located northwest of downtown.

Station history
WTMP plays urban oldies in the Tampa Bay area on frequencies 1150 kHz AM, 102.1 FM (translator, moved from 97.5), and as of October 2022, 92.9 covering Downtown Tampa. Even though its programming and frequencies have  changed over the station's 57-year tenure, its main urban competitor is WBTP. Its target audience is listeners between the ages of 25 and 54.

WTMP, on 1150 AM originally (including a few prior years as urban-formatted WIOK), has been a longtime heritage urban contemporary station in the market.  Noted R&B vocalist and Tampa native King Coleman got his start as a DJ on WTMP in the 1950s. In the late 1990s, the station, then-owned by Broadcast Capital, was bought by Tama Broadcasting, which has headquarters in Tampa, thus making WTMP the flagship.  Long controlled by the Cherry family, Tama also owns stations in Daytona Beach, Jacksonville, Savannah, Georgia and Greenville, South Carolina; it owns newspapers in Daytona Beach and Fort Pierce.  The owner went on to buy the then-WGUL in 2002 and made it a hip hop-urban station (and home to Russ Parr in the Morning) as WTMP-FM.  Even after a format change to rhythmic oldies, that station did not do well due to its rimshot signal, so it ended up as a simulcast of WTMP a year later. The rimshot signal, which barely reaches the Hillsborough County line from its transmitter southeast of Brooksville, also couldn't be moved closer to Tampa or upgraded with changes to the tower or transmitter power, due to interference issues with other stations broadcasting on 96.1 and nearby frequencies.

The Tampa Bay would see an urban-formatted hip hop station months later called WBTP; WLLD is a rhythmic-formatted hip hop station and has been around years prior.  Such competition was a minor setback for WTMP as it was losing younger listeners to WBTP, but it was already restructured to an Urban Adult Contemporary by then anyway. Outside the R&B and Classic Soul playlist tenure, it also offered urban gospel (early weekday mornings and Sundays), Old School Mix shows Friday nights and Blues Sunday nights. It also had talk shows on weekends.

On September 2, 2011, after a 57-year run, WTMP's legacy as an R&B outlet came to an abrupt end at 3 PM as Davidson Media Group took over operation of the station under a local marketing agreement from Tama, who filed for bankruptcy and placed the station in court-ordered receivership. Davidson then flipped the combo to a Spanish tropical format. All of the syndicated shows and airstaff were already pink-slipped a day before the flip.

It was announced that WTMP would return to an urban AC format on May 1, 2014. The two stations were split from common operation with the flip, as the operation of WTMP was taken over by WestCoast Media, while the FM was retained by Davidson.

On March 14, 2016, WTMP flipped to classic hip hop as "Boomin' 1150".

Both WTMP and WTMP-FM were purchased out of bankruptcy by Neal Ardman's NIA Broadcasting, Inc. effective May 18, 2017, at a purchase price of $500,000.

On October 1, 2022, WTMP added translator 92.9FM to boost its coverage into downtown Tampa on the FM dial. This is the first time since the station was on 97.5FM that the station could be heard on FM in and around Tampa.

Former logos

See also
WTMP-FM

References

External links
Official WTMP (AM) Website

FCC History Cards for WTMP

TMP (AM)
Radio stations established in 1954
Urban oldies radio stations in the United States
1954 establishments in Florida